Agriculture continued to be the mainstay of the economy of Haiti in the late 1980s; it employed approximately 66 percent of the labor force and accounted for about 35 percent of GDP and for 24 percent of exports in 1987. The role of agriculture in the economy has declined severely since the 1950s, when the sector employed 80 percent of the labor force, represented 50 percent of GDP, and contributed 90 percent of exports. Many factors have contributed to this decline. Some of the major ones included the continuing fragmentation of landholdings, low levels of agricultural technology, migration out of rural areas, insecure land tenure, a lack of capital investment, high commodity taxes, the low productivity of undernourished 
animals, plant diseases, and inadequate infrastructure. Neither the government nor the private sector invested much in rural ventures; in FY 1989 only 5 percent of the national budget went to the Ministry of Agriculture, Natural Resources, and Rural Development (Ministère de l'Agriculture, des Resources Naturelles et du Développement Rural—MARNDR). As Haiti entered the 1990s, however, the main challenge to agriculture was not economic, but ecological. Extreme deforestation, soil erosion, droughts, flooding, and the ravages of other natural disasters had all led to a critical environmental situation.

After independence from France Alexandre Pétion (and later Jean-Pierre Boyer) undertook Latin America's first, and perhaps most radical, land reform by subdividing plantations for the use of emancipated slaves. The reform measures were so extensive that by 1842 no plantation was its original size. By the mid-nineteenth century, therefore, Haiti's present-day land structure was largely in place. The basic structures of land tenure remained remarkably stable during the twentieth century, despite steadily increasing pressure for land, the fragmentation of land parcels, and a slight increase in the concentration of ownership.

For historical reasons, Haiti's patterns of land tenure were quite different from those of other countries in Latin America and the Caribbean. Most Haitians owned at least some of their land. Complex forms of tenancy also distinguished Haitian land tenure. Moreover, land owned by peasants often varied in the size and number of plots, the location and topography of the parcels, and other factors.

Scholars have debated issues related to land tenure and agriculture in Haiti because they considered census data unreliable. Other primary data available to them were geographically limited and frequently out of date. The three national censuses of 1950, 1971, and 1982 provided core information on land tenure, but other studies financed by the United States Agency for International Development (AID) supplemented and updated census data. The final tabulations of the 1982 census were still unavailable in late 1989.

The 1971 census revealed that there were 616,700 farms in Haiti, and that an average holding of 1.4 hectares consisted of several plots of less than 1 hectare. Haitians, however, most commonly measured their land by the common standard, a carreau, equal to about 1.3 hectares, or 3.2 acres. The survey concluded that the largest farms made up only 3 percent of the total number of farms and that they comprised less than 20 percent of the total land. It also documented that 60 percent of farmers owned their land, although some lacked official title to it. Twenty-eight percent of all farmers rented and sharecropped land. Only a small percentage of farms belonged to cooperatives. The 1950 census, by contrast, had found that 85 percent of farmers owned their land.

Studies in the 1980s indicated a trend toward increased fragmentation of peasant lands, an expanding role for sharecropping and renting, and a growing concentration of higher quality land, particularly in the irrigated plains. As a consequence of high rural population density and deteriorating soils, competition over land appeared to be intensifying. Haiti's land density, that is, the number of people per square kilometer of arable land, jumped from 296 in 1965 to 408 by the mid-1980s—a density greater than that in India.

The three major forms of land tenancy in Haiti were ownership, renting (or subleasing), and sharecropping. Smallholders typically acquired their land through purchase, inheritance, or a claim of long-term use. Many farmers also rented land temporarily from the state, absentee landlords, local owners, or relatives. In turn, renters frequently subleased some of these lands, particularly parcels owned by the state. Renters generally enjoyed more rights to the land they worked than did sharecroppers. Unlike sharecroppers, however, renters had to pay for land in advance, typically for a period of one year. The prevalence of renting made the land market exceedingly dynamic; even small farmers rented land, depending on the amount of extra income they derived from raising cash crops. Sharecropping, also very common, was usually a shorter-term agreement, perhaps lasting only one growing season. Sharecropper and landowner partnerships were less exploitive than those in many other Latin American countries; in most agreements, farmers gave landowners half the goods they produced on the land.

Other land arrangements included managing land for absentee landlords, squatting, and wage labor. The practice of having an on-site overseer (jéran) manage land for another owner, usually another peasant residing far away, was a variation of sharecropping. Jérans were generally paid in-kind for their custodial services. Overgrazing, or unregulated gardening, was the most common form of squatting, which took place on most kinds of lands, especially state-owned land. A small minority of peasants were landless; they worked as day laborers or leased subsistence plots. In addition, thousands of Haitians migrated seasonally to the Dominican Republic as braceros (temporary laborers) to cut sugarcane under wretched conditions.

Land use and farming technology

It is easy to not understand the complex variations in land tenancy without an appreciation of land use and peasant attitudes toward land. More mountainous than Switzerland, Haiti has a limited amount of cultivable land. According to soil surveys by the United States Department of Agriculture in the early 1980s, 11.3 percent of the land was highly suitable for crops, while 31.7 percent was suitable with some restrictions related to erosion, topography, or conservation. The surveys revealed that 2.3 percent was mediocre because of poor drainage, but was acceptable for rice cultivation, and 54.7 percent was appropriate only for tree crops or pastures because of severe erosion or steep slopes. According to estimates of land use in 1978, 42.2 percent of land was under constant or shifting cultivation, 19.2 percent was pasture land, and 38.6 percent was not cultivated.

The use of purchased inputs, such as fertilizers, pesticides, machinery, and irrigation, was rare; farmers in Haiti employed traditional agricultural practices more than did farmers in any other part of the Western Hemisphere. Although Haitian farmers used increased amounts of chemical fertilizers in the 1970s and the 1980s, their use of an average of only seven kilograms per hectare ranked Haiti ahead of Bolivia, only, among Western Hemisphere countries. Peasants applied mostly natural fertilizers, such as manure, mulch, and bat guano. Large landowners consumed most of the country's small amounts of chemical fertilizers, and they benefited from subsidized fertilizers imported from the Dominican Republic and mixed in Port-au-Prince. Five importers controlled the 400,000 kilograms of pesticides that entered the country each year; malaria-carrying mosquitoes and rodents in the rice fields were the main targets of pesticide application. Most rural cultivators used small hand tools, such as hoes, machetes, digging sticks, and a local machete-like tool called the serpette. There was an average of one tractor per 1,700 hectares; most farmers considered such machinery inappropriate for use on tiny plots scattered along deeply graded hillsides. The insecurity of land tenure further discouraged the use of capital inputs.

The amount of irrigated crop land in the 1980s, estimated at between 70,000 and 110,00 hectares, was substantially less than the 140,000 hectares of colonial times. Of the nearly 130 irrigation systems in place, many lacked adequate maintenance, were clogged with silt, or provided irregular supplies to their 80,000 users. By the 1980s, the irrigation network had been extended as far as was possible.

The minimal amount of research on agriculture and the limited number of extension officers that MARNDR provided gave little assistance to already low levels of farming technology. Foreign organizations, such as the Inter-American Institute for Cooperation in Agriculture, carried out the most research. Foreign organizations also provided more technical assistance in agriculture than the government.

Peasant attitudes and limited access to credit also helped to explain the traditional nature of farming. Most observers blamed agricultural underdevelopment on peasants' individualistic nature, their proclivity toward superstition, and their unwillingness to innovate. Small farmers also lacked access to credit. Informal credit markets flourished, but credit was not always available at planting time. When credit was available, it was usually provided at usurious rates. The country's major public financial institutions provided loans to the agricultural sector, but this lending benefited less than 10 percent of all farmers. Major credit sources included the Agricultural Credit Bureau, agriculture credit societies, credit unions, cooperatives, and institutions created by nongovernmental organizations.

Cash crops

Despite its relative decline, coffee endured as the leading agricultural export during the 1980s. The French had introduced coffee to Haiti from Martinique in 1726, and soon coffee became an important colonial commodity. Coffee production peaked in 1790, and it declined steadily after independence. Production dropped precipitously during the 1960s. After a boom in prices and in the production of coffee in the late 1970s, output declined again from 42,900 tons in 1980 to 30,088 tons by 1987. Coffee trees covered an estimated 133,000 hectares in the 1980s, with an average annual yield of 35,900 tons. Haiti was a member of the International Coffee Organization (ICO), but found itself increasingly unable to fulfill its ICO export quota, which stood at 300,000 bags, of 60 kilograms each, in 1988. Most analysts believed that excessive taxation and the low prices afforded to peasant farmers had contributed to the decline in coffee production.

Coffee provides one of the best examples of the market orientation of Haiti's peasant economy. Most peasants grew coffee, usually alongside other crops. More than 1 million Haitians participated in the coffee industry as growers, marketers (known as Madame Sarahs), middlemen (spéculateurs), or exporters. The peasants' widespread participation throughout the coffee industry demonstrated that they were not merely subsistence farmers, but that they were also actively engaged in the market economy. After harvest by peasants, female Madame Sarahs transported coffee to local and urban markets and sold the beans. Middlemen, in turn, sold coffee to members of the Coffee Exporters Association (Association des Exportateurs de Café—Asdec), which set prices and thereby passed on the traditionally high coffee-export taxes directly to producers. Because of its prominent role in agriculture and the inequitable nature of the trade, the coffee industry was the subject of numerous studies. The majority of these studies highlighted imperfect competition and the systematic enrichment of a small group of Port-au-Prince exporters.

Sugar was another cash crop with a long history in Haiti. Christopher Columbus brought sugarcane to present-day Haiti on his second voyage to Hispaniola, and sugar rapidly became the colony's most important cash crop. In the 18th century, Haiti was the world's leading sugar producer. After 1804, production never returned to pre-independence levels, but sugar production and low-level exports continued. Unlike the system in other Caribbean countries, sugar in Haiti was a cash crop raised by peasants rather than by large-scale plantations. According to a 2021 study, "historical property rights institutions [in Haiti] created high transaction costs for converting land to cane production", relative to the other Caribbean countries.

The sugar harvest dipped to under 4 million tons by the early 1970s, but it rebounded to nearly 6 million tons of cane by the middle of the decade with a sharp increase in the world price of the commodity. Lower world prices and structural problems combined to cause a drop in sugar output in the 1980s; by the end of the decade, sugarcane covered fewer than 114,000 hectares of the coastal plains, and it yielded fewer than 4.5 million tons annually.

Further expansion of the sugar industry faced serious deeprooted obstacles. For example, the production cost of Haitian sugar was three times more than the world price in the 1980s. Shifts in the world sugar market, caused mainly by the international substitution of corn-based fructose for sugarcane, exerted further pressure on Haitian producers. One result of this situation was the practice of importing sugar, which was then reexported to the United States under the Haitian sugar quota. Reductions in Haiti's quota during the 1980s, however, limited exchanges of this sort.

Total sugar exports dropped from 19,200 tons in 1980 to 6,500 tons in 1987. In 1981, 1982, and 1988 Haiti exported no sugar. Haiti's four sugar mills closed temporarily on several occasions during the decade. The oldest mill, the Haitian American Sugar Company (HASCO), was the only plant that maintained a large cane plantation. Realizing the dim future for sugar, outside development agencies proposed alternatives to sugar, such as soybeans, for Haiti's plains.

Cacao, sisal, essential oils, and cotton were other significant cash crops. Cacao trees covered an estimated 10,400 hectares in 1987, and they yielded 4,000 tons of cocoa a year. Mennonite missionaries played a growing role in the cocoa industry, mostly around southern departments, especially Grand'Anse. Sisal, exported as a twine since 1927, peaked in the 1950s, as the Korean War demanded much of the nation's 40,000-ton output. By the 1980s, however, Haiti exported an average of only 6,500 tons a year, mainly to the Dominican Republic and Puerto Rico. The substitution of synthetic fibers for sisal reduced most large-scale growing of the plant, but many peasants continued to harvest the natural fiber for its use in hats, shoes, carpets, and handbags. The export of essential oils, derived from vetiver, lime, amyris, and bitter orange, peaked in 1976 at 395 tons. Exports leveled off at a little more than 200 tons during the 1980s, generating an average of US$5 million in foreign exchange. Cotton cultivation peaked in the 1930s, before boll weevils ravaged the crop. Growers introduced a higher quality of cotton, in the 1960s, which was processed in local cotton gins and then exported to Europe. Cotton prices fell in the 1980s, however, and cotton plantings shrank from 12,400 hectares in 1979 to under 8,000 hectares by 1986. Exports ceased. Government policies in the 1980s emphasized diversification into nontraditional export crops that would benefit under the terms of the CBI; the poor performance of traditional cash crops enhanced the importance of these efforts for the Haitian economy.

Food crops
Food crops fared somewhat better than cash crops in the 1980s, as prices for cash crops dropped, and economic uncertainty increased. Nonetheless, real per capita food production declined, and the country continued to import millions of tons of grains. The trend toward increased production of food crops had negative ecological consequences as the planting and the harvesting of tuber staples accelerated soil erosion. Haiti's peasants were already underfed. It was therefore unlikely that farmers would grow tree crops in place of staples without appropriate incentives.

Peasants cultivated a variety of cereals for food and animal feeds, notably corn, sorghum, and rice. Corn, also referred to as maize, was the leading food crop; it was sown on more hectares— 220,000 in 1987—than any other crop. Farmers in southern departments grew corn separately, but elsewhere they mixed it with other crops, mostly legumes. Total production averaged approximately 185,000 tons during the 1980s; yields increased in some areas. Drought-resistant sorghum often replaced corn during the second growing season as the leading crop, but total hectares planted and total production averaged only 156,250 and 125,000 tons, respectively. Rice became an increasingly common cereal, beginning in the 1960s, when increased irrigation of the Artibonite Valley aided larger-scale farming (see fig. 11). Rice production, however, fluctuated considerably, and it remained dependent on government subsidies. An estimated 60,000 hectares of rice yielded an average of 123,000 tons, from 1980 to 1987.

Tubers were also cultivated as food. Sweet potatoes, one of the nation's largest crops, grew on an estimated 100,000 hectares, and they yielded 260,000 tons of produce a year in the 1980s. Manioc, or cassava, another major tuber, was mix-cropped on upwards of 60,000 hectares to produce between 150,000 and 260,000 tons a year, much of which was for direct consumption. The cultivation of yams, limited by the lack of deep moist soils, took up only 26,000 hectares. The tropical Pacific tuber taro, called malangá in Haiti, grew with other tubers on more than 27,000 hectares.

Haitians also cultivated dozens of other food crops. Red, black, and other kinds of beans were very popular; they provided the main source of protein in the diet of millions. As many as 129,000 hectares provided 67,000 tons of beans in 1987. Banana and plantain trees were also common and provided as much as 500,000 tons of produce, almost entirely for domestic consumption. Although the flimsy trees were vulnerable to hurricanes and to droughts, rapid replanting helped sustain the crop. Mangoes, another tree crop, were a daily source of food, and they provided some exports. Other food crops included citrus fruit, avocados, pineapples, watermelons, almonds, coconut, okra, peanuts, tomatoes, breadfruit, and mamey (tropical apricot). In addition, Haitians grew a wide variety of spices for food, medicine, and other purposes, including thyme, anise, marjoram, absinthe, oregano, black pepper, cinnamon, cloves, nutmeg, garlic, and horseradish.

Livestock
Most peasants possessed a few farm animals, usually goats, pigs, chickens and cattle. Few holdings, however, were large, and few peasants raised only livestock. Many farm animals, serving as a kind of savings account, were sold or were slaughtered to pay for marriage, medical emergencies, schooling, seeds for crops, or a vodou ceremony.

From the perspective of rural peasants, perhaps the most important event to occur in Haiti during the 1980s was the slaughter of the nation's pig stock, which had become infected with the highly contagious African swine fever (ASF) in the late 1970s. Having spread from Spain to the Dominican Republic and then to Haiti via the Artibonite River, ASF infected approximately one-third of the nation's pigs from 1978 to 1982. Farmers slaughtered their infected animals. Fear of further infection persuaded peasants to slaughter another one-third in panic sales. A government eradication program virtually wiped out what remained of the 1.2-million pig population by 1982.

At the grassroots level, the government's eradication and repopulation programs became highly controversial. Farmers complained that they were not fairly compensated for—or not paid at all for—their slaughtered livestock and that the sentinel breed of pigs imported from the United States to replace the hardy creole pigs was inappropriate for the Haitian environment and economy. Nonetheless, repopulation of the nation's pigs with both sentinel and Jamaican creole pigs augmented the national stock from an official figure of zero in 1982 to about 500,000 by 1989. Many analysts noted, however, that ASF and the pig slaughter had further impoverished already struggling peasants. The disaster forced many children to quit school. Small farmers mortgaged their land; others cut down trees for cash income from charcoal. The loss of the creole pigs to ASF undoubtedly increased the hardships of the rural population, and it may well have fueled to some degree the popular revolt that forced Jean-Claude Duvalier from power.

Goats were one of the most plentiful farm animals in Haiti. Like the creole pigs, they were well adapted to the rugged terrain and sparse vegetation. Approximately 54 percent of all farmers owned goats; the total had climbed from 400,000 in 1981 to more than 1 million by the late 1980s. Peasants owned the majority of the country's estimated 1 million head of cattle in 1987; about 48 percent of the farmers owned at least one head of cattle. Until 1985 the primary export market for beef cattle was the American baby food industry. Farmers raised sheep in some areas, but these animals were not particularly well adapted to the country's climate. Chickens, ducks, turkeys, and guinea hens were raised throughout Haiti under little supervision, although one medium-sized hatchery raised chickens for domestic consumption. After the swine-flu epidemic and the subsequent slaughter of pigs, chicken replaced pork as the most widely consumed meat in the Haitian diet.

See also
Deforestation in Haiti
Coffee production in Haiti
Economy of Haiti

References